Griggs House is a historic house in Granite, Maryland.

Griggs House may also refer to:

Clark R. Griggs House, in Urbana, Illinois
Hiram Griggs House, in Albany County, New York
Burbank–Livingston–Griggs House, in Saint Paul, Minnesota
Fisher–Nash–Griggs House, in Ottawa, Illinois